County Hall is a municipal facility in Longford, County Longford, Ireland.

History
The site currently occupied by County Hall was once used as a fowl market. Meetings of Longford County Council had previously taken place in Longford Courthouse and a county secretary's office had been established in Dublin Road. The county council meetings and county administration moved to modern facilities at the new County Hall in Great Water Street in 1992. In 2018 the county council announced proposals for a new bridge to link County Hall to the Albert Reynolds Peace Park.

References

Buildings and structures in County Longford
Longford